Theoa is a genus of sheet weavers that was first described by Michael I. Saaristo in 1995.

Species
 it contains six species, found in Asia and on the Seychelles:
Theoa elegans Tanasevitch, 2014 – China, Thailand
Theoa hamata Tanasevitch, 2014 – Thailand, Laos, Indonesia (Sumatra)
Theoa longicrusa Tanasevitch, 2014 – Thailand
Theoa malaya Tanasevitch, 2017 – Malaysia (mainland)
Theoa tricaudata (Locket, 1982) (type) – Seychelles, Thailand, Malaysia (mainland)
Theoa vesica Zhao & Li, 2014 – China

See also
 List of Linyphiidae species (Q–Z)

References

Araneomorphae genera
Linyphiidae
Spiders of Asia